Gustave Honoré Hamilton (27 March 1871, in Brussels – 5 January 1951, in Villefranche-sur-Mer) was a 20th-century Belgian film actor.

He was the nephew of actor, theatre director and playwright Louis Péricaud and the uncle of actor Jacques Sablon.

Filmography 

 1911: Fafarifla ou Le filtre magique by Gaston Velle - Fafarifla
 1911: Pendaison à Jefferson City by Jean Durand 
 1912: La Chasse à l'homme / Cent dollars mort ou vif by Jean Durand
 1912: Le Railway de la mort by Jean Durand
 1912: Le Révolver matrimonial by Jean Durand 
 1928: The New Gentlemen by Jacques Feyder
 1929: Mon béguin by Hans Behrendt
 1930: Romance à l'inconnue by René Barberis
 1930: L'Anglais tel qu'on le parle by Robert Boudrioz - Arthur
 1931: Bombance by Pierre Billon - short film - La Tomate
 1932: Un beau mariage by Charles-Félix Tavano - short film -
 1932: Un client de province by Charles-Félix Tavano - short film - Fanchonnet
 1932: Billeting Order by Charles-Félix Tavano - Frère Dingois
 1933: Le témoin by Pierre de Cuvier - short film -
 1933: Le Grillon du foyer by Robert Boudrioz - Caleb
 1934: Pension Mimosas by Jacques Feyder
 1934: Studio à louer by Jean-Louis Bouquet - short film - M. Le Menhir
 1934: The Man with a Broken Ear by Robert Boudrioz - Le docteur renaud
 1934: Maria Chapdelaine by Julien Duvivier - Le vieux Français
 1935: La Figurante by Charles-Félix Tavano - short film - Le commissaire
 1935: La Mariée du régiment by Maurice Cammage
 1935: L'ami de Monsieur by Pierre de Cuvier - short film - Chantecaille
 1936: Une gueule en or by Pierre Colombier
 1936: The King by Pierre Colombier
 1937: Le concierge revient de suite by Fernand Rivers - short film -
 1937: Ne tuez pas Dolly by Jean Delannoy - short film -
 1937: Boissière by Fernand Rivers
 1937: La Fille de la Madelon by Georges Pallu and Jean Mugeli
 1937: People Who Travel by Jacques Feyder
 1937: Nights of Fire by Marcel L'Herbier
 1938: Son oncle de Normandie / La fugue de Jim Baxter by Jean Dréville
 1939: Menaces by Edmond T. Gréville
 1943: Les Enfants du Paradis by Marcel Carné - film tourné en deux époques - Le concierge du théâtre
 1946: The Marriage of Ramuntcho by Max de Vaucorbeil
 1947: Pour une nuit d'amour by Edmond T. Gréville
 1948: The Pretty Miller Girl by Marcel Pagnol
 1949: Le Roi by Marc-Gilbert Sauvajon
 1950: Guilty? by Yvan Noé
 1950: Dominique by Yvan Noé - Le grand-père

References

External links 
 
 Posters of the films in which Gustave Hamilton played on UniFrance
 Gustave Hamilton on data.bnf.fr

1871 births
1951 deaths
20th-century Belgian male actors
Belgian male film actors
Belgian male silent film actors
Male actors from Brussels